Wane may refer to:

People
 Key Wane
 Shaun Wane (born 1964), English rugby league footballer and coach
 Taylor Wane (born 1968), British pornographic actress and model
 Wané Roonseraw

Religion
 Vanir, a class of deity in Norse mythology

Other
 Wane language
 WANE-TV, a television station (channel 32, virtual 15) licensed to Fort Wayne, Indiana, United States
 Wax and Wane, 1982 song from Garlands album by Scottish band Cocteau Twins
 Wane is the rounded edge on a piece of lumber.